DWSM (102.7 FM), broadcasting as 102.7 Star FM, is a radio station owned and operated by Bombo Radyo Philippines through its licensee People's Broadcasting Service, Inc. Its studio, offices and transmitter are located at Unit D, 18th floor, Strata 2000, F. Ortigas Jr. Ave., Ortigas Center, Pasig. Its news center, which hosts Bombo Radyo's flagship national newscast Bombo Network News, is located at Florete Bldg., 2406 Nobel St. cor. Edison St., Makati.

As of Q4 2022, 102.7 Star FM is the 8th most-listened to FM radio station (and #6 among masa stations) in Metro Manila, based on a survey commissioned by Kantar Media Philippines and Kapisanan ng mga Brodkaster ng Pilipinas.

History

1978–1987: WXB

The station was established in 1978 under the call letters DWXB. It was initially known as Magic Disco 102 with a disco format and was owned by the National Council of Churches in the Philippines, with studios located at the Philippine Christian University along Taft Avenue, Manila. In 1982, DWXB was acquired by Universal Broadcasting Network and rebranded as Cute 102 with a Top 40 format. It transferred to Donada St. near the Rizal Memorial Coliseum in Pasay. In 1983, it rebranded as WXB 102 and added New Wave music to its playlist. It was in 1985 when it became a fully fledged New Wave station. It inspired many rock artists such as The Dawn, Identity Crisis, and Violent Playground.  It briefly competed with another New Wave station, Power 105 BM FM (now known as Q105). Despite a signal of a minuscule 1 kilowatt, it acquired a cult following. The station signed off on June 9, 1987, when the Corazon Aquino administration began sequestering the properties owned by her predecessor Ferdinand Marcos and his cronies. The studio of WXB 102 was sequestered. The successor of WXB 102, NU 107, owned by the Progressive Broadcasting Corporation, began broadcasting on October 31, 1987, until its demise on November 8, 2010.

1987–1994: The Gentle Wind

Bombo Radyo Philippines acquired the station, changed its call letters to DWSM and rebranded it as 102.7 WSM The Gentle Wind. Its transmitter power was increased dramatically to 25 kilowatts. At that time, their studios and transmitter were located at the Philippine Communications Center (PHILCOMCEN) building (now demolished in 2015) in Pasig. At the same time, the station started programming with an easy listening format. It went off the air on March 30, 1994.

1994–present: Star FM
Bombo Radyo Network rebranded the station as 102.7 Star FM on April 22, 1994, using the English medium and it changed its language of medium to Filipino at the dawn of the new millennium when the Masa format started. The new format played OPM songs, along with foreign songs and news every Monday to Saturday (also Sundays, when breaking news or developing story warrants) at 7:00 am–8:00 am, 12:00 noon-12:30 pm, and 6:00 pm–7:00 pm, and they also provide news updates on a regular basis throughout the day and The Holy Rosary simultaneously from 31 Bombo Radyo and Star FM Stations in 24 key cities nationwide since April 5, 2010, operates from Monday to Sunday at 9:00-9:30 pm. Back in 1995, Star FM Manila played musics in the 60s, 70s, 80s and 90s and it is the only station to play music on a compact disc. Notable programs in the 90s are included, It's All For You (in the Morning/Afternoon/Evening), Star Sweep, Twilight Zone, among others. The station started the "masa" trend in FM stations. On February 24, 2013, Star FM relocated the studios from the EGI Building in Taft, Pasay to its current home in Strata 2000 in Pasig in line with the modern broadcast standards. Often times during the current Star FM period, its jingles are based on those made by JAM Creative Productions (Flame Thrower Cuts 4, 6, 10 and 11; Warp Factor Cut 14; Closer to the Music Cut 7; Z World Cut 21).

References

External links
Star FM Manila FB Page

OPM formatted radio stations in the Philippines
102.7 Star FM
Radio stations established in 1978
Bombo Radyo Philippines